Richfield is a city in Lincoln County, Idaho, in the United States. The population was 482 at the 2010 census.

Geography
Richfield is located at  (43.052629, -114.153041).

The Little Wood River flows nearby, and the Richfield region is supplied with irrigation water diverted from the Big Wood River near Magic Reservoir.

History
A book about the History of the Richfield area was written in 1995 by Alice Crane Behr and Maureen Hancock Ward. It was subsequently published and printed. The text of this book is available at the Richfield City Website.

Demographics

2010 census
At the 2010 census there were 482 people in 172 households, including 124 families, in the city. The racial makup of the city was 89.4% White, 0.6% Native American, 8.1% from other races, and 1.9% from two or more races. Hispanic or Latino of any race were 12.2%.

Of the 172 households 41.9% had children under the age of 18 living with them, 57.0% were married couples living together, 7.6% had a female householder with no husband present, 7.6% had a male householder with no wife present, and 27.9% were non-families. 21.5% of households were one person and 11.1% were one person aged 65 or older. The average household size was 2.80 and the average family size was 3.28.

The median age was 32.2 years. 28.8% of residents were under the age of 18; 11.4% were between the ages of 18 and 24; 25.9% were from 25 to 44; 20.7% were from 45 to 64; and 13.1% were 65 or older. The gender makeup of the city was 51.0% male and 49.0% female.

2000 census
At the 2000 census there were 412 people in 15 households, including 3 families, in the city. The racial makup of the city was 90.78% White, 0.24% African American, 0.73% Native American, 6.07% from other races, and 2.18% from two or more races. Hispanic or Latino of any race were 8.50%.

Of the 15 households 32.7% had children under the age of 18 living with them, 56.6% were married couples living together, 5.7% had a female householder with no husband present, and 34.6% were non-families. 28.9% of households were one person and 17.0% were one person aged 65 or older.  The average household size was 2.59 and the average family size was 3.25.

The age distribution was 30.8% under the age of 18, 9.5% from 18 to 24, 26.0% from 25 to 44, 20.6% from 45 to 64, and 13.1% 65 or older.  The median age was 32 years. For every 10 females there were 34.0 males.  For every 10 females age 18 and over, there were 33.7 males.

The median household income was $28,846 and the median family income  was $13,173. Males had a median income of $9,028 versus $2,833 for females. The per capita income for the city was $12,759.  About 11.0% of families and 12.6% of the population were below the poverty line, including 14.2% of those under age 18 and 16.2% of those age 65 or over.

See also
 List of cities in Idaho

References

External links

 

Cities in Lincoln County, Idaho
Cities in Idaho